Hsinchu Pei Ying junior high school, officially the Pei Ying junior high school, Hsinchu City. It is at No. 4, Xuefu Road, East District, Hsinchu City, Taiwan.

Area
Its area is about 3.9 ha.

History
The school is the former position of Japanese Dong Shan Elementary School (東山小學校).

The school founded on April 17 of 1956.

Moved to the present position in August 1957.

Renamed as Pei Ying junior high school Hsinchu County (新竹縣立培英國民中學) in 1968.

Renamed as Pei Ying junior high school Hsinchu City (新竹市立培英國民中學) in 1982.

Building Introduction

Campus landscape

See also
 Education in Taiwan

Note

External links

Lunch of Pei Ying junior high school (Chinese)
Worldpedia-Hsinchu Pei Ying junior high school

1956 establishments in Taiwan
Educational institutions established in 1956
High schools in Taiwan
Schools in Hsinchu